The Bellingham Bells are a collegiate summer baseball team in the West Coast League. 

The team is composed of college baseball players from teams around the U.S. In recent years, the Bells have produced a number of Major League players including Marc Rzepczynski of the 2011 World Series Champion St. Louis Cardinals, Jeff Francis of the 2007 National League Champion Colorado Rockies, Adrian Sampson (Texas Rangers), Spencer Howard (Philadelphia Phillies), Seth Martinez (Houston Astros), Michael Rucker (Chicago Cubs) and Whatcom County natives Ty Taubenheim (Toronto Blue Jays), Kevin Richardson (Texas Rangers). Bellingham also rostered former Tennessee Titans quarterback Jake Locker while he was playing football at the University of Washington.

History

2023 
On August 25th, 2022, former Bells coach Jim Clem was announced as the team manager for the 2023 season.

2022 
The 2022 Bells finished first in the WCL North division with 33 wins and 20 losses. Pitcher and "Bell of the Year" Trevin Hope led the league with an ERA of 2.64 while Ryan Beitel threw a 3.57 ERA and won five games on the mound. The Bells saw 62,979 total fans for an average of 1,968 per game, third overall in the league.

The Bells went undefeated in the division playoffs. They swept the HarbourCats in the semifinal and defeated the AppleSox in the final. The Bells fell to the Corvallis Knights in the WCL Title game 5-0.  This is the Bells first championship appearance since 2016.

After the season, Hope was named WCL Pitcher of the Year.

2021 
The West Coast League and Bells returned for the 2021 season after COVID-19 shut down the league the previous season. The Bells finished second in the North Division with a 24-24 record. The Bells finished third in league attendance with 51,248 total tickets sold for an average of 1,464 fans per game.

2020 
The 2020 season was cancelled due to the COVID-19 pandemic.

2019 
The 2019 season proved to be an up and down campaign for the team. The Bells came within one game of winning the first half WCL north crown to put them in the playoffs, losing a heartbreaker to WCL North champion Victoria in the final game of the first half. The team's first half performance produced 5 all stars with Guthrie Morrison OF (Gonzaga), Jack Machtolf OF (Gonzaga), Troy Viola 3B (San Jose St), Jimmy Chatfield RP (Yale), and Nick Proctor SP (Cal - Berkeley) all representing the squad. Troy was also invited to participate in the home run derby and ended up leading the team with 8 homers on the year. The second half saw many new faces on a Bells squad that fought hard, but in the end was not able to make the WCL playoffs. Nick Proctor was a member the All WCL first team, while Jimmy Chatfield was named to the All WCL second team. The community in Bellingham rallied around the Bells, packing Joe Martin with 50,344 fans in 28 games for an average of almost 1,800 fans a game.

2018 
The Bells dominated the WCL north in 2018 going 35-19 and winning both the first and second half titles for their division. The Bells had many stand out performers on their squad, including Matt McLain (UCLA) who was named the WCL top prospect as an incoming freshman. The Bells were well represented in the WCL All Star Game with Justin Armbruester (PLU) being the winning pitcher, Taylor Davis (Gonzaga), Bellingham local Ernie Yake (Gonzaga), and team homerun leader Matt James (Notre Dame) all representing the team. The team also boasted 3 1st team (Ernie Yake SS, Nick Nastrini SP (UCLA), and Theron Kay RP (Cal-State Northridge), and 3 2nd team All WCL players (Zach Needham 1B (Lewis-Clark State), Taylor Davis RP, and Justin Armbruester SP). The first round of the playoffs featured a matchup between the Bells and the Kelowna Falcons, where the Bells were defeated in the deciding third game of the series. There was a large spike in attendance as the Bells saw a rise in popularity in 2018, with 51,635 fans making it to 35 for an average crowd of 1,475, good for third in the WCL.

2017 
Despite falling one game short of the playoffs in 2017 after going 31-23 on the season, the fight for the post season provided a variety of very dramatic endings. Kyle Stowers (Stanford) provided two occasions where he was responsible for the walk-off hit to win the game. A non-league game ended in a Home Run Derby tie-breaker after extra innings, including an exciting finish and game-winning dinger by Chase Illig (West Virginia). Illig also was awarded Player of the Week mid-season, set the record for most home runs during the WCL season at 15 and was awarded WCL Player of the Year Honors. Hometown kid, and 2019 5th round draft pick Austin Shenton, was the WCL Batting Champ, finishing the season with a .409 batting average. The attendance at Bells games also grew in 2017, finishing third in overall attendance, 36,569, which averages to 1,407 fans per game.

2016 
The Bells made it back to the WCL Championship Series after going 32-22 in the regular season. The North Division Champs faced the Corvallis Knights of the South Division for the title in a hard-fought three-game series. Even though the Knights ended up winning the title (2 games to 1), the Bells still had a very successful season overall. Shane Hanon (Marshall University) was crowned WCL Batting Champ, finishing the season with a .331 batting average. The Bells also had one of their standout pitchers from the 2015 and 2016 season, Spencer Howard, drafted 45th overall in the 2016 MLB Draft to the Philadelphia Phillies and is #20 on their Top 30 prospect list.

2015 
Following the WCL Championship Season, the Bells were looking to defend their title. Though they went 33-21 on the season, they were unable to make it back to the playoffs. The highlight of the season though was the 2015 WCL All-Star Game, hosted by the Bells at Joe Martin Field. The Bells were able to represent themselves at the game by having six players in the All-Star Game. These players include Justin Calomeni (now with the Colorado Rockies organization), Andrew Kemmerer, Bronson Larsen, Andrew Reichenbach, Dustin Breshears, and Aaron Stroosma. The Bells finished the 2015 season fourth in attendance, with 34,435 attendees to Joe Martin Field.

2014 
The Bellingham Bells became the 4th team in WCL history to win a championship, going 37-17 for the season. David Bigelow set a WCL record for most games played, with 29 games in the season. As a whole team, the Bells had 20 saves on the season setting the record for the most saves by any team in WCL history. Their 0.202 opponents' batting average as a team tied the record set by the 2005 Aloha Knights. Bellingham saw 47,307 fans in the seats at Joe Martin Field in just 32 home games, with an average of 1,478 people per night.

The Original Bellingham Bells 
The Bells take their name from the original Bellingham Bells who played at Battersby Field off and on from the 1930s to 1988. The original Bells came to prominence under the leadership of Joe Martin (the namesake of the ballpark of the current incarnation of the Bells), who helped lead the Bells to 20 National Baseball Congress Washington State titles and multiple top five finishes at the NBC World Series during the height of their semi-pro prominence from 1946 to 1972, when the Bellingham Dodgers brought minor league baseball to Bellingham. The original Bells played in leagues with the Alaska Goldpanners, Humboldt Crabs, Grand Junction Eagles, Anchorage Glacier Pilots, and Wichita Service Auto Glass.

Season-by-season record

Playoff appearances
2022 WCL North Division Champions
2021 
2018 WCL North Division Champions
2016 WCL North Division Champions
2015 
2014 West Coast League Champions
2012
1999 PIL Champions and National Baseball Congress World Series Participant

Broadcast
Bells home games are broadcast on the official West Coast League streaming site. Radio broadcasts are on Mixlr.com (Monday-Thursday) and KBAI (Friday-Sunday).<ref>

References

External links 
 Bellingham Bells - official site
 West Coast League - official site

Amateur baseball teams in Washington (state)
1999 establishments in Washington (state)
Baseball teams established in 1999
Bellingham, Washington